Nigel Barker may refer to:

Nigel Barker (photographer) (born 1972), British photographer
Nigel Barker (rugby league) (born 1955), English rugby league footballer of the 1970s and 1980s
Nigel Barker (sprinter) (1883–1948), Australian Olympian